The New Zealand women's national cricket team toured England and the Netherlands between June and August 1984. They played England in three Test matches and three One Day Internationals, with the Test series ending as a 0–0 draw and the ODI series ending as a 3–0 victory for England. They then played the Netherlands in 1 ODI, as part of the Nederlandsche Dames Cricket Bond 50th Anniversary Tournament, which was Netherlands' first full international match.

Squads

Tour Matches

England

1-day single innings match: Thames Valley and Middlesex Second XI v New Zealand

40-over match: Middlesex v New Zealand

1-day single innings match: Surrey v New Zealand

50-over match: Sussex v New Zealand

1-day single innings match: East Anglia v New Zealand

1-day single innings match: East Midlands v New Zealand

55-over match: Yorkshire v New Zealand

1-day single innings match: Yorkshire, Lancashire and Cheshire v New Zealand

1-day single innings match: Women's Cricket Association President's XI v New Zealand

1-day single innings match: West Midlands v New Zealand

15-over match: West Midlands v New Zealand

2-day match: West of England v New Zealand

1-day single innings match: Kent v New Zealand

2-day match: Young England v New Zealand

Netherlands

55-over match: Women's Cricket Association v New Zealand

WODI Series

1st ODI

2nd ODI

3rd ODI

WTest Series

1st Test

2nd Test

3rd Test

Only ODI: Netherlands v New Zealand

References

External links
New Zealand Women tour of England 1984 from Cricinfo
New Zealand Women tour of Netherlands 1984 from Cricinfo

Women's cricket tours of England
1984 in English cricket
New Zealand women's national cricket team tours
International cricket tours of the Netherlands